Tommaso Gasparotti (1785 – December 1847) was an Italian poet, painter, paleographist and bibibliophile archivist in Parma. 

He was born in Parma, son of a painter, who trained with Biagio Martini. He trained under Martini alongside Giovanni Battista Borghesi. He also studied ancient Latin and Italian inscriptions. He was adept at manuscript illumination. In 1808, he worked for the Archivio Farnesiano in Parma, and became director from 1814 till his death. He organized the state archive of Parma, including its diplomatic correspondence.

References

1785 births
1847 deaths
Writers from Parma
19th-century Italian painters
19th-century Italian male artists
Italian male painters
Painters from Parma
Italian palaeographers
Italian librarians